Rhythm Serenade is a 1943 British musical film directed by Gordon Wellesley and starring Vera Lynn, Peter Murray-Hill and Julien Mitchell.

It was shot at the Riverside Studios in Hammersmith. The film's sets were designed by the art director George Provis. It was made by the British subsidiary of Columbia Pictures. George Formby, then under contract to Columbia, served as associate producer on the film.

Plot
A teacher goes to work organising a nursery for a munitions factory. She establishes one at a cottage and has a romance with the owner.

Cast
Vera Lynn as Ann Martin 
 Peter Murray-Hill as John Drover
 Julien Mitchell as Mr. Jimson 
 Charles Victor as Mr. Martin 
 Jimmy Jewel as Jimmy Martin
 Ben Warriss as Ben Martin 
 Joss Ambler as Mr. Preston 
 Rosalyn Boulter as Monica Jimson 
 Betty Jardine as Helen 
 Irene Handl as Mrs. Crumbling 
 Lloyd Pearson as Mr. Simkins 
 Jimmy Clitheroe as Joey 
 Joan Kemp-Welch as Bit part
 Aubrey Mallalieu as Vicar
 Leslie Phillips as Soldier

References

External links
Rhythm Serenade at IMDb
Rhythm Serenade at Letterbox DVD
Rhythm Serenade at BFI

1943 films
1943 musical films
British black-and-white films
British musical films
Columbia Pictures films
Films shot at Riverside Studios
1940s English-language films
1940s British films